The 2021 Liga 1 de Fútbol Profesional (known as the Liga 1 Betsson 2021 for sponsorship reasons) was the 105th season of the Peruvian Primera División, the highest division of Peruvian football. A total of 18 teams competed in the season, with Sporting Cristal coming in as defending champions.

The season was originally scheduled to start on 26 February 2021, while the draw, which was originally scheduled to take place on 5 February 2021, was postponed due to the effects of the second wave of the COVID-19 pandemic in Peru. Because of this, the Peruvian Football Federation (FPF) also postponed the start of the tournament, with 12 March 2021 as the new date.

Alianza Lima were the champions, winning their twenty-fourth league title by defeating Sporting Cristal in the finals by a 1–0 aggregate score.

Competition format
The format for this season was unveiled by the Liga de Fútbol Profesional on 16 January 2021. The season was divided into three stages: Fase 1, Fase 2, and the Playoffs. In Fase 1, the 18 teams were drawn into two groups of nine with the winners of each group playing a final to decide the Fase 1 winner, while Fase 2 was played under a single round-robin format with the 18 teams playing each other once.

The playoffs were to be contested by the winners of Fase 1 and Fase 2, as well as the top two teams of the aggregate table, which would play two semifinals with the winners playing the final to decide the national champion. If the Fase 1 or Fase 2 winners also ended up in the top two of the aggregate table, they would get a bye to the finals. However, in case a team won both stages of the competition, the playoffs would not be played and that team would be declared as champion. The bottom two teams of the aggregate table at the end of the season were relegated, with the team placed in 16th place playing a relegation playoff against the Liga 2 runners-up.

It was expected that, pending approval from the Peruvian government and health authorities, the competition would be played at the teams' respective home stadiums after health concerns by the COVID-19 pandemic caused the previous season to be concluded in Lima. However, the Fase 1 and later the Fase 2 were confirmed to be played entirely in the Peruvian capital, with the return of province teams to their home stadiums expected for 2022.

Teams
18 teams played in the 2021 Liga 1 season. The top seventeen teams in the 2020 Liga 1 took part, along with the 2020 Liga 2 champions Alianza Atlético.

Stadia and locations

The following stadiums were used to host matches:

Managerial changes

Notes

Fase 1

Group A

Group B

Results

Fase 1 final

Fase 2

Standings

Results

Aggregate table

Playoffs

Finals

First leg

Second leg

Alianza Lima won 1–0 on aggregate.

Relegation playoff
The relegation playoff was originally played by Binacional, as the team placed 16th in the Liga 1 aggregate table and the Liga 2 Revalidación winners Carlos Stein, with Carlos Stein winning on penalties after a 1–1 draw on aggregate. However, on 20 January 2022 the Court of Arbitration for Sport overturned a ruling by the FPF in which Cusco were awarded a 3–0 win in their Fase 2 match against Cienciano which had originally ended in a 2–2 draw. Due to this, Cusco fell to 17th place in the aggregate table and were relegated to Liga 2, while Binacional moved up one place to 15th and were reinstated in Liga 1.

On 21 January 2022, the FPF confirmed that they would abide by the CAS ruling and also ruled out a replay of the relegation playoff series, this time between Carlos Stein and Universidad San Martín who went up to 16th place in the aggregate table as an effect of this ruling, with which Universidad San Martín also avoided relegation whilst Carlos Stein's promotion was confirmed.

Tied 1–1 on aggregate, Carlos Stein won on penalties and were promoted to Liga 1.

Top scorers

Liga 1 awards
On 9 December 2021, the Liga 1 announced the nominees for the 2021 Liga 1 awards. The award ceremony was held on 15 December 2021, 18:00 local time (UTC−5), at the Peruvian Football Federation headquarters. The winners were chosen based on voting by coaches and captains of 2021 Liga 1 teams, local sports journalist and Liga 1 fans fans on social media.

The following awards were also awarded:
Top goalscorers: Two winners, both with 12 goals.
 Luis Iberico from Melgar.
 Felipe Rodríguez from Carlos A. Mannucci.
Fair Play award: Alianza Lima (ranked first in the Fair Play standings).

Best XI
The best XI team of the 2021 Liga 1 season was also announced during the award ceremony.

See also
 2022 Supercopa Peruana
 2021 Copa Bicentenario
 2021 Liga 2
 2021 Copa Perú
 2021 Copa Generación

References

External links
Official website 
Liga 1 news at Peru.com 
Liga 1 statistics and news at Dechalaca.com 

2021
Peru
Peru